Animal Theology is a 1994 book by the ethicist and theologian Andrew Linzey, that examines the treatment and status of animals from a theological perspective.

Summary 
In the book, Linzey reconsiders what Christians see to be God's original plan for humanity's ruling of nature. He argues against previous conceptions of this connection which have been used to justify animal cruelty, instead claiming that such a relationship instead implies that the mission laid out by God is a model of generosity towards the oppressed and vulnerable, which is applicable to both humans and other animals.

Reception 
The American philosopher Daniel Dombrowski, described the book in positive terms, stating that "what Linzey calls the 'generosity paradigm'" is a valuable concept that Christianity can contribute to the animal rights debate. 

Bronislaw Szerszynski criticised Linzey's view regarding "animal experiments, hunting, meat-eating and genetic engineering", summing it up with the phrase "don't do it", as "too absolutist", for failing to acknowledge the complexities of the modern moral landscape.

Linzey's book was reviewed from three different perspectives in the Baptist theological journal Review & Expositor: theological, Old Testament and New Testament. Sally Smith Holt described Animal Theology as a "worthwhile endeavor in Christian scholarship", that will nevertheless, "not convince all Christians to become vegetarians". Mark McEntire claims that the Old Testament lacks sufficient content to be a basis of Linzey's generosity ethic. David D. May in his review, drew attention to Linzey's repudiation of elements of the New Testament, stating "special pleading does not do justice to text-segments that would be problematic for an animal theology."

Editions 
Animal Theology has been translated into French, Spanish, Italian and Japanese.

See also 
Christian vegetarianism

References 

1994 non-fiction books
Animal ethics books
Books about animal rights
Christian theology books
Christian vegetarianism
English-language books
SCM Press books